Thana Proper is an administrative unit, Union council, of Malakand District in the Khyber Pakhtunkhwa province of Pakistan.

District Malakand has 2 Tehsils i.e. Swat Ranizai and Sam Ranizai. Each Tehsil comprises certain numbers of Union councils. There are 28 union councils in district Malakand.

See also 

Malakand District

External links
Khyber-Pakhtunkhwa Government website section on Lower Dir
United Nations
Hajjinfo.org Uploads
PBS paiman.jsi.com

Malakand District
Populated places in Malakand District
Union councils of Khyber Pakhtunkhwa
Union Councils of Malakand District